Notker Labeo (c. 950 – 28 June 1022), also known as Notker the German or Notker III, was a Benedictine monk and the first commentator on Aristotle active in the Middle Ages. "Labeo" means "the thick-lipped one". Later he was named Teutonicus in recognition of his services to the German language.

Life and career
He was born about 950, from a noble family of Thurgau, and he was a nephew of Ekkehard I, the poet of Waltharius. He went to the Abbey of Saint Gall when only a boy, and there acquired a vast and varied knowledge by omnivorous reading. After finishing his education, he continued in the abbey as a teacher and then head of the school under  abbot Burckhard II. His contemporaries admired him as a theologian, philologist, mathematician, astronomer, connoisseur of music, and poet. He tells of his studies and his literary work in a letter to Bishop Hugo of Sitten (998–1017), and we also know of his activities through texts from his pupil Ekkehard IV.

The Necrologium sancti Galli recorded his death under 28 June, 1022, as "Obitus Notkeri doctissimi atque benignissimi magistri". He died stricken by the plague.

Among his most distinguished pupils are the aforementioned Ekkehard IV, Salomo III bishop of Constance, and Batherus, a wandering scholar who wrote a biography of St. Fridolin.

Writings and translations
For the benefit of his pupils he translated several texts from Latin into German. He mentions eleven of these translations, but unfortunately only five are preserved: (1) Boethius, "De consolatione philosophiae"; (2) Martianus Capella, "De nuptiis Philologiae et Mercurii"; (3) Aristotle, "De categoriis"; (4) Aristotle, "De interpretatione"; (5) "The Psalter". Among those lost are: "The Book of Job", at which he worked for more than five years; "Disticha Catonis"; Virgil's "Bucolica"; and the "Andria" of Terence (Terenz in German).

Of his own writings he mentions in the above letter a "New Rhetoric" and a "New Computus" and a few other smaller works in Latin. We still possess the Rhetoric, the Computus (a manual for calculating the dates of ecclesiastical celebrations, especially of Easter), the essay "De partibus logicae", and the German essay on Music.

In Kögel's opinion Notker Labeo was one of the greatest stylists in German literature. "His achievements in this respect seem almost marvelous." His style, where it becomes most brilliant, is essentially poetical; he observes with surprising exactitude the laws of the language and created the first systematic orthography of Old High German. Latin and German he commanded with equal fluency; and while he did not understand Greek, he was weak enough to pretend that he did. He put an enormous amount of learning and erudition into his commentaries on his translations. Much may be found that was of interest in his time, philosophy, universal and literary history, natural science, astronomy. He frequently quotes the classics and the Fathers of the Church. It is characteristic of Notker that at his dying request the poor were fed, and that he asked to be buried in the clothes which he was wearing in order that none might see the heavy chain with which he had been in the habit of mortifying his body.

References

Sources
 
 Schoolmasters of the Tenth Century. Cora E. Lutz, Archon Books (1977).
 Notker l'Allemand (French), in the Historical Dictionary of Switzerland.
  
 

950s births
1022 deaths

Year of birth uncertain
10th-century mathematicians
11th-century mathematicians
German Benedictines
German Christian monks
Medieval linguists
German music theorists
Monks at Saint Gall
German translators
German male non-fiction writers
10th-century German writers
11th-century German writers
Medieval German mathematicians
11th-century translators
10th-century Latin writers
11th-century Latin writers